Lilian Afegbai (born 11 November 1991) is a Nigerian actress and film producer. She is a former Big Brother Africa housemate. In 2018 she won the Africa Magic Viewers' Choice Awards (AMVCA) for the Indigenous movie of the Year for her production debut Bound in 2018.
In 2019, she launched her lingerie and gym Wear line "Lilly’s Secret"

Early life
Afegbai was born on 11 November 1991. She grew up in Edo state, Nigeria.

Career
Lilian Afegbai was a contestant on the reality show Big Brother Africa in 2014, and gained fame as a result. She featured in the 2015 film Road to yesterday. She featured as herself in a short film Pepper soup. She appeared on Mnet's tv series Do good as Venice the blogger 2015/2016. She co-produced the movie Dark Past. She started entertainment company EEP entertainment. She debuted as a producer with the movie Bound, which featured celebrities Rita Dominic, Enyinna Nwigwe, Joyce Kalu and Prince Nwafor.

Filmography

Awards

References

External links
 

Living people
Actresses from Edo State
Participants in Nigerian reality television series
Nigerian film actresses
Nigerian film producers
Africa Magic Viewers' Choice Awards winners
Benson Idahosa University alumni
1991 births
Big Brother (franchise) contestants